The Cape grass lizard (Chamaesaura anguina), also known as the Cape snake lizard or the highland grass lizard, is a species of lizard in the genus Chamaesaura. It widely found in southern Africa, inhabiting grasslands. In one of the countries it lives in, Eswatini, it is listed as a Near Threatened species.

The Cape grass lizard is ovoviviparous. A discovery has shown females are not breeding at the same time in a year.

This lizard has three subspecies. They are the C. a. anguina, the C. a. oligopholis, and the C. a. tenuior.

Distribution
The Cape grass lizard is widely distributed in the grasslands of southern Africa. It has been reported in South Africa, Eswatini, Angola, Kenya, Tanzania, Mozambique, the Republic of the Congo, and Uganda. The grasslands that the Cape grass lizard inhabits often have wildfire.

Breeding
The Cape grass lizard is ovoviviparous, meaning eggs will stay inside the mother until they are ready to hatch. The average clutch size is three to seventeen eggs. A discovery has revealed that females are breeding throughout the year. This adaptation is probably to prevent the total loss of reproductive gain in a year due to fire.

Subspecies
The Cape grass lizard has three known subspecies.

 C. a. anguina - This subspecies was first described by Carl Linnaeus in 1758.
 C. a. tenuior - In 1895, Albert C. L. G. Günther described this subspecies.
 C. a. oligopholis - Laurent described this subspecies in 1964.

Conservation
The Southern African Red Data and the IUCN Red List do not mention the Cape grass lizard. However, the Swaziland Red Data has the lizard listed as Near Threatened. The Transvaal grass lizard is also listed as a Near Threatened species.

See also
 Chamaesaura

References

Reptiles described in 1758
Taxa named by Carl Linnaeus
Chamaesaura
Reptiles of Eswatini
Reptiles of Angola
Reptiles of Kenya
Reptiles of Tanzania
Reptiles of Mozambique
Reptiles of the Republic of the Congo
Reptiles of Uganda
Lizards of Africa
Reptiles of South Africa